Dea Loher (born 1964) is a German playwright and author.

Biography
Dea Loher was born Andrea Beate Loher in 1964 in Traunstein, Bavaria, Germany. She initially used the first name Dea as a pen name, but eventually changed her name officially to Dea. She studied German literature and philosophy at the Ludwig Maximilian University of Munich. She then spent a year in Brazil. In 1990, she began studying creative writing for the stage with Heiner Müller and Yaak Karsunke at the Berlin University of the Arts. Her first plays premiered in the early 1990s, and she gained recognition as one of the most important young playwrights of her time in Germany. Dea Loher has since been awarded major prizes for drama and literature in Germany, including the Joseph-Breitbach-Preis.

Works

Dramas 
 Tätowierung (Premiere at the Ensemble Theater am Südstern, Berlin, 1992) 
 Olgas Raum (Olga's Room) (Premiere at the Ernst Deutsch Theater, Hamburg, 1992) 
 Leviathan (Premiere at the Niedersächsisches Staatstheater, Hanover, 1993) 
 Fremdes Haus (Premiere at the Niedersächsisches Staatstheater, Hanover, 1995) 
 Adam Geist (Premiere at the Niedersächsisches Staatstheater, Hanover, 1998) 
 Blaubart - Hoffnung der Frauen (Premiere at the Bayerisches Staatsschauspiel München, Munich, 1997) 
 Manhattan Medea (Premiere at steirischer herbst, 1999) 
 Berliner Geschichte (Premiere at the Niedersächsisches Staatstheater, Hanover, 2000)
 Klaras Verhältnisse (Premiere at the Burgtheater, Vienna, 2000) 
 Der dritte Sektor (Premiere at the Thalia Theater, Hamburg, 2001) 
 Magazin des Glücks (Premiered at the Thalia Theater, Hamburg, 2001-2002) 
 Unschuld (Premiere at the Thalia Theater, Hamburg, 2003) 
 Das Leben auf der Praca Roosevelt (Premiere at the Thalia Theater, Hamburg, 2004) 
 Quixote in der Stadt (Premiere at the Thalia Theater, Hamburg, 2005) 
 Land ohne Worte (Premiere at the Münchner Kammerspiele, Munich, 2007) 
 Das letzte Feuer (Premiere at the Thalia Theater, Hamburg, 2008) 
 Diebe (Premiere at the Deutsches Theater, Berlin, 2010)
 Am Schwarzen See (Premiere at the Deutsches Theater, Berlin, 2012)

Libretto 
 Licht. Opera. Music by Wolfgang Böhmer (Premiere at the Neuköllner Oper, Berlin, 2004)

Prose 
 Hundskopf (Göttingen: Wallstein Verlag, 2005)
 Bugatti taucht auf (Göttingen: Wallstein Verlag, 2012)

Awards
 1990 Playwrights Prize awarded by the Hamburger Volksbühne for Olgas Raum
 1992 Royal Court Theatre Playwrights Award 
 1993 Stücke-Förderpreis awarded by the Goethe Institute (for Tätowierung in Friderike Vielstich's production at the Theater Oberhausen)
 1993 Frankfurter Autorenstiftung Prize (Frankfurt Author Foundation)
 1993 Chosen as "Nachwuchsdramatikerin des Jahres" (Young Playwright of the Year) by the German publication Theater heute 
 1994 Chosen as "Nachwuchsdramatikerin des Jahres" (Young Playwright of the Year) by the German publication Theater heute
 1995 Schiller Memorial Prize
 1997 Jakob-Michael-Reinhold-Lenz Prize for Drama (forAdam Geist) 
 1997 Gerrit-Engelke Prize
 1998 Mülheimer Dramatikerpreis (for Adam Geist) 
 2005 Else Lasker-Schüler Dramatist Prize
 2006 Bertolt Brecht Literature Prize
 2008 Mülheimer Dramatikerpreis (for Das letzte Feuer)
 2008 Play of the Year for Das letzte Feuer by jury selection for the German publication Theater Heute
 2009 Berlin Literature Prize
 2009 Marieluise-Fleißer-Preis
 2014/2015 Stadtschreiber von Bergen

Secondary Literature

 Michael Börgerding: Auf der Suche nach den vielen Antworten. Über Dea Loher und ihre Stücke – eine persönliche Vergewisserung. In: Theater heute, 10, 2003, S. 42–46
 Michael Börgerding: Was erzählt die nackte Brust von Irmgard Möller im SPIEGEL. In: Groß, Khuon (Hrsg.): Dea Loher und das Schauspiel Hannover. S. 82–88
 Jean-Claude Francois: Dea Loher: Dramaturge de l'Allemagne nouvelle. In: Allemagne aujourd'hui, 160, 2002, S. 171–186
 Birte Giesler: Überall Täter: Geschlechterkritik in Dea Lohers „Blaubart – Hoffnung der Frauen". In: Forum Modernes Theater, Band 20:1, 2005, S. 77–95
 Jens Groß, Ulrich Khuon (Hrsg.): Dea Loher und das Schauspiel Hannover. Niedersächsisches Staatstheater Hannover, 1998
 Birgit Haas: Die Renaissance des dramatischen Dramas. In: Birgit Haas: Plädoyer für ein dramatisches Drama. Passagen Verlag, Wien 2007, S. 177–219
 Birgit Haas: Dea Loher. Vorstellung. In: Monatshefte, 99, 2007, S. 269–277
 Birgit Haas: Die Rekonstruktion der Dekonstruktion in Dea Lohers Dramen, oder: Die Rückkehr des politischen Dramas. In: Monatshefte, 99, 2007, S. 280–298
 Birgit Haas: Das Theater von Dea Loher: Brecht und (k)ein Ende. Aisthesis Verlag, Bielefeld 2006
 Birgit Haas (Hrsg.): Dea Loher. Special Issue. In: Monatshefte, 99, 2007
 Birgit Haas: Gender-Performanz und Macht. (Post)feministische Mythen bei Sarah Kane und Dea Loher. In: Birgit Haas (Hrsg.): Macht – Performanz, Performativität und Polittheater seit 1990. Königshausen & Neumann, Würzburg 2005, S. 197–227
 Birgit Haas: History Through the Lens of the Uncertainty Principle: Dea Loher's Leviathan. In: Journal of the M/MLA, 39:1, 2006, S. 73–88
 Birgit Haas: Sexual Abuse: Dea Loher's Tätowierung (1992). In: Birgit Haas: Modern German Political Drama 1980–2000. Camden House, New York 2003, S. 146–148
 Birgit Haas: The Rote Armee Fraktion: Dea Loher's Leviathan (1993). In: Birgit Haas: Modern German Political Drama 1980–2000. S. 170–173
 Ulrich Khuon: Das Spiel des Schreibens und seine Anstöße. Dea Loher und das Autorentheater in Hannover. In: Groß, Khuon (Hrsg.): Dea Loher und das Schauspiel Hannover. S. 9–14
 Nils Lehnert: Gesellschaftsrelevant, aber nicht offen ‚engagiert'. Zum didaktischen wie ästhetischen Potenzial von Dea Lohers Theatertexten Diebe (2010), Am Schwarzen See (2012) und Gaunerstück (2015). In: Marijana Jeleč (Hrsg.): Tendenzen der Gegenwartsliteratur. Literaturwissenschaftliche und literaturdidaktische Perspektiven. Peter Lang, Berlin 2019, S. 307–329.
 Sascha Löschner: Dea Loher: Verletzte Sprache. In: Stück-Werk 1. Internationales Theaterinstitut, Berlin 1997, S. 71–73
 Alexandra Ludewig: Dea Lohers Theaterstück Adam Geist. In: Forum Modernes Theater, 15, 2002, S. 113–124
 Alexandra Ludewig: Junges Theater im Deutschland der 1990er Jahre: Dea Lohers Adam Geist. In: New German Review, 1998, S. 55–73
 Malgorzata Sugiera: Beyond Drama: Writing for Postdramatic Theatre. In: Theatre Research International 1, 2004, S. 16–28
 Malgorzata Sugiera: Realne światy / Możliwe światy. Niemiecki dramat ostatniej dekady (1995–2004). Księgarnia Akademicka, Kraków 2005
 Sandra Umathum: Unglückliche Utopisten. In: Christel Weiler, Harald Müller (Hrsg.): Stück-Werk 3. Zentrum Bundesrepublik Deutschland des Internationalen Theaterinstituts, Berlin 2001, S. 101–105
 Birte Werner: Das Drama ist die Wirklichkeit. Theatertexte von Autorinnen der 1990er Jahre. Gesine Danckwart, Dea Loher, Theresia Walser. In: Der Deutschunterricht; Beiträge zu seiner Praxis und wissenschaftlichen Grundlegung, 58:4, 2006, S. 63–73
 Peter Yang: Dea Loher. In: The Literary Encyclopedia – 1(4.1: German-language Writing and Culture), 2017, litencyc.com
 Peter Yang: Innocence (Unschuld) by Dea Loher (2003). In: The Literary Encyclopedia – 1(4.1: German-language Writing and Culture), litencyc.com

Weblinks

External links
 Works by and about Dea Loher on Worldcat.org
 Dea Loher biography, part of the Goethe Institute's New Dramatic Art

German women dramatists and playwrights
20th-century German dramatists and playwrights
21st-century German dramatists and playwrights
Living people
People from Traunstein
1964 births
21st-century German women writers
20th-century German women writers